Philippe Brizard (28 August 1933 – 20 February 2021) was a French actor.

Partial filmography

 (1963) - Un spectateur hilare à la conférence (uncredited)
 (1964) - Le coiffeur (uncredited)
Cent briques et des tuiles (1965) - Zecca (uncredited)
 (1967) - Me Castard / Me Questard
 (1967) - Pernon
 (1968) - Un père (uncredited)
 (1968) - Le réparateur
 (1970) - Leplanchet, le cocu joueur de boules
Last Known Address (1970) - Le chauffeur de taxi (uncredited)
 (1971) - Le gardien de prison
Où est passé Tom? (1971)
Avoir 20 ans dans les Aurès (1972) - La Marie
La Scoumoune (1972) - Fanfan
The Infernal Trio (1974) - Chambon
 (1974)
The Phantom of Liberty (1974) - Le barman
French Connection II (1975) - Taxi Driver (uncredited)
 (1975) - Gauthier
Incorrigible (1975) - L'expert en tableaux
 (1976) - Commissaire Aubry
Monsieur Klein (1976) - (uncredited)
 L'hippopotamours (1976) - Le VRP
 (1975) - Cuffier / l'employé de la perception
Le Juge Fayard dit Le Shériff (1977) - Le directeur de la prison
Rene the Cane (1977) - Le chef de la police marseillaise
 (1977)
 (1977)
Pour Clémence (1977) - Un policier du métro
 (1977) - Léon
The Savage State (1977) - Paul
 (1978) - Un joueur de cartes
 (1979)
 (1979) - L'agent d'accueil de l'hôpital
The Woman Cop (1979) - Juge d'instruction dans le Midi
Jupiter's Thigh (1980) - Le touriste français
The Lady Banker (1980) - Chériaux
 (1981) - Jules Giroux
 (1981) - Adjudant-chef Colin
The Cabbage Soup (1981) - Le facteur
Espion, lève-toi (1982) - Le collaborateur de Grenier
 (1982) - Gardien prison
The Big Brother (1982) - Le conseiller
 (1983) - L'ingénieur radio
Le Bon Plaisir (1984) - Le maître d'hôtel du président
 (1986) - Un banquier (uncredited)
 (1986) - Moretti, L'appariteur
L'enfance de l'art (1988)
 (1988) - L'hôtelier
Le jeu du renard (1990) - Réalisateur radio RTL
Le Roi danse (2000) - Clergyman

References

2021 deaths
1933 deaths
20th-century French male actors